Antony Basker Raj (25 June 1930 – 23 August 2020), also known as A. Bhaskar Raj, was an Indian director of Malayalam movies.

Career 

From 1951 to 1960, he directed ten Singalese (Sinhala) movies followed by directing 65 Malayalam movies from 1963 until 1984. He also directed two Tamil movies. He was the father of National Award-winning actress Saranya Ponvannan, who is a leading actress in Tamil cinema. A. B. Raj was the Second Unit Assistant Director of The Bridge on the River Kwai by David Lean.

Death
He died on 23 August 2020 due to a heart attack at the age of 90.

Filmography

Malayalam movies
Ormikkan Omanikkan (1985)
Manase Ninakku Mangalam (1984)
Ningalil Oru Sthree (1984)
Thaalam Thettiya Tharattu (1983)
Aakrosam (1982)
Kazhu Maram (1982)
Adima Changala (1981)
Agni Saram (1981)
Vazhikal Yaathrakkar (1981)
Kalam Kaathu Ninnilla (1979)
Irumbazhikal (1979)
Kazhukan (1979)
Aana Kalari (1978)
Avakaasham (1978)
Kanal Kattakal (1978)
Prarthana (1978)
Raju Rahim (1978)
Society Lady (1978)
Aval Oru Devaalayam (1977)
Bharya Vijayam (1977)
Kaduvaye Pidicha Kiduva (1977)
Chirikudukka (1976)
Light House (1976)
Prasadam (1976)
Seemantha Puthran (1976)
Ashthami Rohini (1975)
Chief Guest (1975)
Chumadu Darling (1975)
Oomana Kunju (1975)
Soorya Vamsam (1975)
Tourist Bungalow (1975)
Honeymoon (1974)
Rahasyarathri (1974)
Agnathavasam (1973)
Football Champion (1973)
Pacha Nottukal (1973)
Sasthram Jayichu Manushyan Thottu (1973)
Kalippava (1972)
Nirthasala (1972)
Sambhavami Yuge Yuge (1972)
'Marunnattil Oru Malayali' (1971)
Neethi (1971)
Ezhuthatha Katha (1970)
Lottery Ticket (1970)
 Danger Biscuit (1969)
Kannoor Deluxe (1969)
Kaliyalla Kalyanam (1968)

Tamil movies
 Thulli Odum Pullimaan (1971)
 Kai Niraya Kasu (1974)

Sinhala movies
Prema Tharagaya (1953)
Ahankara Sthree (1954)
Perakadoru Bena (1955)
Ramyalatha (1956)
Sohoyuro (1958)
Vana Mohini (1958)

See also
List of Malayalam films from 1971 to 1975
List of Malayalam films from 1976 to 1980
List of Malayalam films from 1981 to 1985

References

External links
National Awards

Tamil film directors
Malayalam film directors
1925 births
2020 deaths
Film directors from Kerala
Artists from Alappuzha
20th-century Indian film directors
Screenwriters from Kerala
Film producers from Kerala
Malayalam screenwriters
Malayalam film producers